Ergasilus is a genus of copepod crustaceans occurring in both the ocean and fresh water, often called gill lice. The females are parasitic upon the gills of fishes. Being copepods, gill lice have a single median eye on their head. The second antennae are modified into prehensile pincers. Male gill lice are free-living.

Species include:

Ergasilus anchoratus Markevich, 1946
Ergasilus arthrosis L. S. Roberts, 1969
Ergasilus auritus Markevich, 1940
Ergasilus briani Markevich, 1932
Ergasilus caeruleus C. B. Wilson, 1911
Ergasilus celestis J. F. Müller, 1937
Ergasilus centrarchidarum Wright, 1882
Ergasilus cerastes L. S. Roberts, 1969
Ergasilus chautauquaensis Fellows, 1887
Ergasilus clupeidarum S. K. Johnson & W. A. Rogers, 1972
Ergasilus cotti Kellicott, 1892
Ergasilus cyanopictus
Ergasilus cyprinaceus W. A. Rogers, 1969
Ergasilus elongatus C. B. Wilson, 1916
Ergasilus felichthys (Pearse, 1947)
Ergasilus fryeri
Ergasilus funduli Krøyer, 1863
Ergasilus gibbus Von Nordmann, 1832
Ergasilus globosus
Ergasilus labracis Krøyer, 1863
Ergasilus lanceolatus C. B. Wilson, 1916
Ergasilus lizae Krøyer, 1863
Ergasilus longimanus
Ergasilus luciopercarum Henderson, 1926
Ergasilus manicatus C. B. Wilson, 1911
Ergasilus megaceros C. B. Wilson, 1916
Ergasilus mugilis Vogt, 1877
Ergasilus myctarothes
Ergasilus nerkae L. S. Roberts, 1963
Ergasilus orientalis
Ergasilus rhinos Burris & G. C. Miller, 1972
Ergasilus sieboldi Von Nordmann, 1832
Ergasilus tenax L. S. Roberts, 1965
Ergasilus turgidus Fraser, 1920
Ergasilus versicolor C. B. Wilson, 1911
Ergasilus wareaglei S. K. Johnson, 1971
Ergasilus wilsoni

References 

Poecilostomatoida
Parasitic crustaceans
Taxa named by Alexander von Nordmann